Carl Frederick Zeidler (January 4, 1908 – December 11, 1942) was an American politician and the mayor of the city of Milwaukee, Wisconsin, from 1940 to 1942, winning election by unseating six-term Socialist mayor Dan Hoan. After just two years in office Zeidler resigned his position as mayor to enlist in the United States Navy Reserve to fight in World War II. His merchant marine ship and all hands were lost off the coast of South Africa in December 1942.

Biography

Early years
Zeidler was born January 4, 1908, in Milwaukee, Wisconsin to parents of German ancestry. He graduated from Marquette University in 1929 and received a J.D. in 1931.

Political career
Serving as an assistant city attorney for Milwaukee (1936–1940), Zeidler stunned the city when he upset six-term Socialist mayor Daniel Hoan to become mayor of Milwaukee in 1940. Hoan had served as mayor for the past 24 years.

His rise to power was orchestrated by young writers Robert Bloch (later the author of Psycho) and Harold Gauer, who created elaborate campaign shows. In Bloch's autobiography, Once Around the Bloch, he gives an inside account of the campaign, and the innovations he and Gauer came up with ... for instance, the original "releasing-balloons-from-the-ceiling" schtick. He comments bitterly on how, after Zeidler's election, they were ignored and not even paid their promised salaries, while credit was taken by local establishment figures like Milton Rice Polland instead.

Bloch ends the account with a philosophical point:

Death and legacy

Zeidler's election was attracting attention on the national political scene as World War II broke out. After a year in office, Zeidler came to believe he could best help the war effort by enlisting; he resigned his position as mayor and accepted a Naval Reserve commission on April 8, 1942. He asked for the most dangerous job on ship and became officer in charge of a gun battery on board the merchant ship SS La Salle.

The ship and all hands were reported missing off the coast of South Africa on December 11, 1942, sunk by a German U-boat U-159 torpedo attack. Zeidler was officially presumed dead November 7, 1944. A gravestone cenotaph marks his plot at Forest Home Cemetery in Milwaukee.

Carl's brother, socialist Frank P. Zeidler later became mayor of Milwaukee and served in that position from 1948 to 1960. Carl's personal and mayoral papers are archived at Milwaukee Public Library alongside those of his brother Frank.

See also

 Frank P. Zeidler
 List of mayors of Milwaukee

References

1908 births
1940s missing person cases
1942 deaths
20th-century American politicians
American people of German descent
Marquette University alumni
Marquette University Law School alumni
Mayors of Milwaukee
Military personnel from Milwaukee
Missing in action of World War II
Missing person cases in Africa
People who died at sea
United States Navy officers
United States Navy personnel killed in World War II
United States Navy reservists